Inga macrophylla is a species of plant in the family Fabaceae. It is found in tropical South America. The common name  ingá-chinelo derives from the fact that the fruit pods are large and flat like a flip flop.

References

macrophylla
Endemic flora of Venezuela